Flateyjarbók ("Book of Flatey") is an important medieval Icelandic manuscript. It is also known as GkS 1005 fol. and by the Latin name Codex Flateyensis. It was commissioned by Jón Hákonarson and produced by the priests and scribes Jón Þórðarson and Magnús Þórhallsson.

Description 
Flateyjarbók is the largest medieval Icelandic manuscript, comprising 225 written and illustrated vellum leaves. It contains mostly sagas of the Norse kings as found in the Heimskringla, specifically the sagas about Olaf Tryggvason, St. Olaf, Sverre, Hákon the Old, Magnus the Good, and Harald Hardrada. But they appear here expanded with additional material not found elsewhere (some of it being very old) along with other unique differences. Most—but not all—of the additional material is placed within the royal sagas, sometimes interlaced. Additionally, the manuscript contains the only copy of the eddic poem Hyndluljóð, a unique set of annals from creation to 1394, and many short tales not otherwise preserved such as Nornagests þáttr ("the Story of Norna Gest").

Especially important is the Grœnlendinga saga ("History of the Greenlanders"), giving an account of the Vinland colony with some differences from the account contained in Eiríks saga rauða ("History of Eirík the Red"). Here also are preserved the only Icelandic versions of the Orkneyinga saga ("History of the Orkney Islanders") and Færeyinga saga ("History of the Faroe Islanders").

History 
From internal evidence the book was being written in 1387 and was completed in 1394 or very soon after. The first page states that its owner is "Jonn Hakonar son" and that the book was scribed by two priests. One of them, "Jon prestr Þórðar son", scribed the contents from the tale of Eirík the Traveller down to the end of the two Olaf sagas and the other, "Magnús prestr Thorhallz sun", scribed the earlier and later material and also drew the illustrations.

Further material was inserted towards the end of the 15th century.

The manuscript first received special attention by the learned in 1651 when Bishop Brynjólfur Sveinsson of Skálholt, with the permission of King Frederick III of Denmark, requested all folk of Iceland who owned old manuscripts to turn them over to the Danish king, providing either the original or a copy, either as a gift or for a price. Jon Finnsson, who resided on Flatey ('Flat Island') in the fjord of  Breiðafjörður on the northwest coast of Iceland, was then the owner of the book which was already known as the Flateyjarbók. At first Jon refused to release his precious heirloom, the biggest and best book in all of Iceland, and he continued to refuse even when Bishop Brynjólfur paid him a personal visit and offered him five hundreds of land. Jon only changed his mind and bestowed the book on the bishop just as the bishop was leaving the region.

The manuscript was given as a present from Bishop Brynjólfur to King Frederick III in 1656, and placed in the Royal Library of Copenhagen. In 1662, the bishop presented the king with a second medieval manuscript, the Codex Regius (Konungsbók eddukvæða). It and Flateyjarbók survived the Copenhagen Fire of 1728 and the Second Battle of Copenhagen in 1807 and were eventually repatriated to Iceland in 1971 as Icelandic national treasures. They are preserved and studied by the Árni Magnússon Institute for Icelandic Studies.

Contents 
Flateyjarbók consists of the following texts:

 Geisli – a religious poem on St. Olaf II of Norway
 Ólafs ríma Haraldssonar – a poem on St. Olaf in the rímur style, the earliest such poetry
 Hyndluljóð
 A short piece from Gesta Hammaburgensis Ecclesiae Pontificum
 Sigurðar þáttr slefu
 Hversu Noregr byggðist
 Genealogies of Norwegian kings
 Eiríks saga víðförla
 Ólafs saga Tryggvasonar (en mesta), including:
 Saga of the Greenlanders, consists of:
 Eiríks þáttr rauða
 Grœnlendinga þáttr (I)
 Færeyinga saga
 Jómsvíkinga saga
 Otto þáttr keisara
 Fundinn Noregr
 Orkneyinga þáttr
 Albani þáttr ok Sunnifu
 Íslands bygging
 Þorsteins þáttr uxafóts
 Sörla þáttr
 Stefnis þáttr Þorgilssonar
 Rögnvalds þáttr ok Rauðs
 Hallfreðar þáttr vandræðaskálds
 Kjartans þáttr Ólafssonar
 Ögmundar þáttr dytts
 Norna-Gests þáttr
 Helga þáttr Þórissonar
 Þorvalds þáttr tasalda
 Sveins þáttr ok Finns
 Rauðs þáttr hins ramma
 Hrómundar þáttr halta
 Þorsteins þáttr skelks
 Þiðranda þáttr ok Þórhalls
 Kristni þáttr
 Svaða þáttr ok Arnórs kerlingarnefs
 Eindriða þáttr ilbreiðs
 Orms þáttr Stórólfssonar
 Hálfdanar þáttr svarta
 Haralds þáttr hárfagra
 Hauks þáttr hábrókar

 Ólafs saga helga, including:
 Fóstbrœðra saga
 Orkneyinga saga
 Færeyinga saga
 Nóregs konungatal
 Haralds þáttr grenska
 Ólafs þáttr Geirstaðaálfs
 Styrbjarnar þáttr Svíakappa
 Hróa þáttr heimska
 Eymundar þáttr hrings
 Tóka þáttr Tókasonar
 Ísleifs þáttr biskups
 Eymundar þáttr af Skörum
 Eindriða þáttr ok Erlings
 Ásbjarnar þáttr Selsbana
 Knúts þáttr hins ríka
 Steins þáttr Skaptasonar
 Rauðúlfs þáttr
 Völsa þáttr
 Brenna Adams byskups
 Sverris saga
 Hákonar saga Hákonarsonar
 An addendum to Ólafs saga helga by Styrmir Kárason
 A saga of King Magnus the Good and King Harald Hardrada of the Morkinskinna type
 Hemings þáttr Áslákssonar
 Auðunar þáttr vestfirzka
 Sneglu-Halla þáttr
 Halldórs þáttr Snorrasonar
 Þorsteins þáttr forvitna
 Þorsteins þáttr tjaldstæðings
 Blóð-Egils þáttr
 Grœnlendinga þáttr (II) (not to be confused with the first Grœnlendinga þáttr)
 Helga þáttr ok Úlfs
 Játvarðar saga helga – Saga of King Edward
 Flateyjarannáll

Modern translations 
Flateyjarbók is currently being translated into English by the Saga Heritage Foundation of Norway. The translator is Alison Finlay, professor of Medieval English and Icelandic Literature at Birkbeck, University of London. A Norwegian edition, translated by Edvard Eikill and comprising six volumes, was completed in 2019.

Notes

References 

 Rowe, Elizabeth Ashman (2005). The Development of Flateyjarbók. Odense: The University Press of Southern Denmark.
 Guðbrandur Vigfússon and Carl Rikard Unger, (ed.) (1860–1868). Flateyjarbok: En samling af Norske Konge-saegar, 3 Vols. Christiania [Oslo]: P. T. Mallings forlagsboghandel.
 Anderson, Rasmus B. (trans. ed.) (1906). The Flatey Book and Recently Discovered Vatican Manuscripts Concerning America as Early as the Tenth Century. London: The Norroena Society. (Facsimiles of Icelandic text, Icelandic transcription, Danish translation, English translation of Vinland material and related material only.)

Editions and translations

Editions 

 Flateyjarbók, ed. by Guðbrandur Vigfússon and C.R. Unger: volume 1 (1860), volume 2 (1862), volume 3 (1868), also digitised at Heimskringla.no (diplomatic edition)
 Flateyjarbók, [ed. by Sigurður Nordal], 4 vols (Akranes: Flateyjarútgáfan, 1944–45) (normalised Old Norse spelling)

Translations 
 (Tale of Halfdan the Black, pp. 1–10; Tale of Hauk High-Breeches, pp. 11–20)

External links 
 GKS 1005 fol., Digitized manuscript, handrit.is
 Flateyjarbok translation project, The Saga Heritage Foundation
 Elizabeth Ashman Rowe, "Cultural Paternity in the Flateyjarbók Óláfs saga Tryggvasonar," Alvíssmál 8 (1998): 3–28.